The ARIA Singles Chart ranks the best-performing singles in Australia. Its data, published by the Australian Recording Industry Association, is based collectively on each single's weekly physical and digital sales. There were 20 Number 1 singles in 2000, including "Blue (Da Ba Dee)" by Eiffel 65, which had already spent seven weeks at Number 1 in 1999.

Fourteen acts gained their first Number 1, either as a lead or featured artist: Macy Gray, Killing Heidi, Chris Franklin, *NSYNC, Bardot, Destiny's Child, Madison Avenue, Bomfunk MC's, Anastacia, Pink, Spiller, Sophie Ellis-Bextor, Wheatus and Baha Men. Both Madonna and Kylie Minogue earned two Number 1 singles during the year.

NSYNC's "Bye Bye Bye" and Anastacia's "I'm Outta Love" both spent the most weeks at Number 1 with five weeks each. Destiny's Child's "Say My Name", Madonna's "Music", and Baha Men's "Who Let the Dogs Out?" all spent four weeks at the top spot.

Chart history

Number-one artists

Songs that peaked at number two include "Shackles (Praise You)" by Mary Mary, "Candy" by Mandy Moore,  "Graduation (Friends Forever)" by Vitamin C, "Never Be the Same Again" by Melanie C feat. Lisa "Left Eye" Lopes  and "Jumpin', Jumpin'" by Destiny's Child

Songs that peaked at number three include "She Bangs" by Ricky Martin, Lucky by Britney Spears, "Gotta Tell You" by Samantha Mumba, "We Will Rock You" by Five + Queen and "Steal My Sunshine" by Len.

Other hit songs included "Shine" by Vanessa Amorosi (4),  Rock DJ By Robbie Williams (4),  "It's My Life" by Bon Jovi (5), "Don't Tell Me" by Madonna (8), Let's Get Loud by Jennifer Lopez (9)

References

Sources
Australian Record Industry Association (ARIA) official site
OzNet Music Chart

2000 in Australian music
2000 record charts
2000